Mirsharai Upazila is an upazila of Chattogram District in Chattogram Division, Bangladesh. It consists 2 Thanas and 2 Pauroshavas. The two Thanas are Jorargonj Thana and Mirsharai Thana and, the two Pauroshavas are Baraiyarhat and Mirsharai.

History
Sultan Fakhruddin Mobarak Shah conquered Chittagong in 1340 AD and established the Muslim rule in this region. During the reign of Gaur Sultans Hussain Shah and Nusrat Shah, Paragal Khan and Chhuti Khan were the rulers of this area. Subsequently, Nizam Shah, brother of emperor Sher Shah, was the ruler of this area. Nizampur Pargana is named after Nizam Shah and the whole area of Mirsharai came under the control of Nizampur pargana. From the beginning of the 16th century this region was very rich in Bangla literature. Most of the time between 1580 and 1666 this region was under the control of the Arakanese. The place at which (of the present Mirsharai thana) Bujurg Umed Khan, son of Subadar Sayesta Khan, landed after crossing the Feni River was named as Bujurg Umedpur. With the conquest of Chittagong by Bujurg Umed Khan in 1666, this region came permanently under the Mughal rule. Towards the end of British rule in India, Durgapur and Karerhat areas of Mirsharai upazila were the centres of revolutionary activities of Chittagong. A fierce battle was fought between the freedom fighters (under Capt. Wali Ahmed) and the Pak army at a place adjacent to the Fenafuni Bridge on the south of Mirsharai sadar in which about 100 Pak soldiers were killed. Besides, direct encounters were held between the freedom fighters and the Pak army at many' places including Shuvapur Bridge, Hinguli Bridge, Aochi Mia Bridge and Mostan Nagar.

Geography
It has 55771 households and total area 482.88 km2.

Demographics
In the 1991 census in Bangladesh, Mirsharai had a population of 325712. Males constituted 49.97% of the population, and females 50.03%. This Upazila's eighteen up population is 160496. Mirsharai has an average literacy rate of 37.2% (7+ years), and the national average of 32.4% literate.

Administration
Mirsharai Upazila is divided into Baroiarhat Municipality, Mirsharai Municipality, and 16 union parishads: Dhum, Durgapur, Haitkandi, Hinguli, Ichakhali, Jorarganj, Katachhara, Khaiyachhara, Korerhat, Maghadia, Mayani, Mirsharai, Mithanala, Osmanpur, Saherkhali, and Wahedpur. The union parishads are subdivided into 113 mauzas and 208 villages.

Baroiarhat Municipality and Mirsharai Municipality are each subdivided into 9 wards.

Education

Average literacy 52%; male 56.3%%, female 47.9%. According to Banglapedia, JB High School,Moliaish High School, Sarkarhat N. R. High School, Meherunnesa Foiz High School, Osmanpur High School, Julonpool Beni Madhob High school, Baroiarhat Girls High School, Bamon Sundar Fakir Ahmed High School, Naherpoor High School, Durgapup N C High School, Joynaddanpur High School, Shantirhat Islamia Madrasha, Al-Jamiatul Arabia Kachemul Uloom Kazirhat Hifz Madrasah and Orphanage, North Haithkandi, Vorer Bazar, Mirsarai, Tetoya Madrsas, Osmanpur Nuria Islamia Madrasa, Mithacara Madrasa, Mirsari Pilot School, Aburhat High School, Korerhat K.M. High school, Sayed Ali High School]], founded in 1939, is a notable secondary school.

Zahedul Islam Zulonpole Govt Primary School

List of colleges:
There are one government college in Mirsarai Upazila- Nizampur Govt. College.
Other  colleges are: 
 Mirsarai University College,
 Professor Kamal Uddin Chowdhury College,
 Baroiarhat College,
 Mahajanhat FR College.

Jorargonj Women College is the only college for women in this Upazila.

Textile Engineering College Chittagong (CTEC) located in Jorargonj, Mirsarai.

See also
Mahamaya irrigation project
Upazilas of Bangladesh
Districts of Bangladesh
Divisions of Bangladesh
Mirsharai bus crash

References